The Old Ignatians' Rugby Football Club is a rugby union club which plays in the New South Wales Suburban Rugby Union and is based in Sydney, Australia.

History
The Old Ignatians' Rugby Football Club was founded in 1969. The Club was founded by and is associated with, the Old Ignatian's Union, the ex-students association of Saint Ignatius' College, Riverview, a Jesuit school for boys, established in 1880 and located on Sydney's lower North Shore. The school has been an active participant in the Athletic Association of the Great Public Schools of New South Wales, which has one of the oldest rugby competitions in Australia. The club won the New South Wales Suburban Rugby Union competition's Division One trophy, the Kentwell Cup in 2002.  The Club has also won a number of other Division One trophies, including Burke Cup in 2003 and 1999.

Club colours and home ground
The club colours are red, white and blue and the home ground  is at Ryde Oval.

Premierships

Life Members
No: 1 Peter Ryan, inducted 1991

No: 2 Les Kirkpatrick, inducted 1992

No: 3 Mark Richards, inducted 1992

No: 4 John Bain, inducted 1993

No: 5 Dr Terry Horgan, inducted 1994

No: 6 Richard Mort, inducted 1998

No: 7 Joe Brown, inducted 1999

No: 8 Paul Timmins, inducted 1999

No: 9 Tim Richards, inducted 2003

No: 10 Michael Fahey, inducted 2004

No: 11 Damian Peppitt, inducted 2007

No: 12 Charles Perrignon, inducted 2009

No: 13 Matthew Perrignon, inducted 2009

No: 14 Dave Bryant, inducted 2013

No: 15 Guy Coleman, inducted 2013

No: 16 Gerard Hogan, inducted 2017

No: 17 Peter Cahill , inducted 2019

No: 18 Dominic Lombardo, inducted 2019

Notable players
 John Tighe – Italy (2009), OIRFC club captain (2007), Judd Cup premiership captain (2009)
 Mickey Palmer - Sydney (2002)3rd grade “Whiddon cup” premier, (2003) 2nd grade “Burke cup” premier, (2006 - 2015) colts coach - premiers Barbour cup (2008, 2010, 2014)

See also
Rugby union in New South Wales
List of Riverview Old Ignatians

References

External links
Old Ignatians' Union Homepage

Rugby union teams in Sydney
Rugby clubs established in 1969
1969 establishments in Australia